Ilir Latifi (born July 28, 1983) is a Swedish mixed martial artist who previously fought in the Heavyweight division of the UFC. A two-time national wrestling champion and a professional MMA competitor since 2008, Latifi has also competed in Shark Fights, Rumble of The Kings, and GLORY.

Mixed martial arts career

Background
With a considerable number of wrestlers in his family, Latifi began wrestling at a young age. Latifi continued to wrestle in order to pursue his dream of one day being world champion. In 2005, he began to follow in his older brother's footsteps by training MMA as a result of his dissatisfaction with the constant rule changes in wrestling. Latifi competed at the 2005 ADCC European trials, where his division was won by Alistair Overeem, but he did not earn a spot at the 2005 ADCC championships. Although Latifi did not compete at the 2009 ADCC European Trials, he was invited to the 2009 ADCC Championships, where he lost in the first round to Alexandre Ribeiro via points (2–0).

Early career
Latifi started his career as a heavyweight. His first professional MMA fight was on May 17, 2008 with the Real Pain Challenge promotion against future Bellator fighter and WSOF Heavyweight champion Blagoi Ivanov. However, the fight was ruled a no contest 55 seconds into the first round, as Latifi drove Ivanov into one of the posts on the ring and destroyed it.

Next he fought future UFC heavyweight Christian Colombo on September 6, 2008. The bout was first booked as a professional contest, but would later be changed to an amateur or semi-pro bout which is not listed on the fighters professional records. Latifi won the fight by submission due to a north-south choke in the first round. Back in professional competition Latifi had his last fight as a heavyweight, before dropping down to light heavyweight, on October 25, 2008 at Superior Challenge 2, where he defeated Roman Mihocka by knockout in the second round.

He holds a notable win over MMA- and kickboxing veteran Tony Lopez. Lopez came in to the fight on a 7-fight winning streak. Latifi used his superior wrestling and also his improved striking to shut Lopez down to win a unanimous decision. He has also fought against former Bellator Light Heavyweight champion and former MFC Light Heavyweight Champion Emanuel Newton and Tatsuya Mizuno. His early career success has led to Latifi being ranked as one of the top Light Heavyweights in Europe.

He became the first Superior Challenge Light Heavyweight Champion after defeating Jorge Oliveira for the vacant belt on October 6, 2012 at Superior Challenge 8.

Ultimate Fighting Championship
Latifi made his UFC debut against at the time #10 ranked, former Strikeforce Light Heavyweight Champion Gegard Mousasi on April 6, 2013 at UFC on Fuel TV 9, on four days notice, reportedly cutting weight from 105 kg (231 lbs) to 93.4 kg (206 lbs), replacing his injured training partner Alexander Gustafsson. Latifi lost the fight via unanimous decision. After the fight UFC President Dana White praised Latifi for taking a fight against a top 10 fighter like Mousasi on such short notice and promised that Latifi would get another fight in the promotion.

In his second fight for the promotion, Latifi fought MMA- and kickboxing veteran Cyrille Diabaté on March 8, 2014 at UFC Fight Night 37. Latifi won the fight via submission in the first round. His opponent, Diabaté retired from MMA and the UFC following his loss to Latifi.

Latifi was later expected to face Tom Lawlor on July 19, 2014 at UFC Fight Night 46. However, Lawlor later had to withdraw from the bout citing an injury, and was replaced by promotional newcomer Chris Dempsey. Latifi effectively used leg kicks to disable his opponent, before finishing him with punches, ending the fight via first-round knockout.

Latifi faced promotional newcomer Jan Błachowicz on October 4, 2014 at UFC Fight Night 53. He lost the fight via TKO in the first round.

Latifi next faced Hans Stringer on July 18, 2015 at UFC Fight Night 72. He won the fight by knockout after dropping Stringer with an overhand right and following up with punches on the ground, stopping the fight 56 seconds into the first round.

Latifi faced Sean O'Connell on January 17, 2016 at UFC Fight Night 81. He won the fight by knockout, having landed a vicious overhand right that wobbled O'Connell, followed by a right hook that dropped him to the canvas, 28 seconds into the first round. Following the fight, Latifi expressed his desire to fight in a main event in his hometown Malmö.

Latifi faced Gian Villante on March 5, 2016 at UFC 196. He won the fight via unanimous decision.

Latifi next faced Ryan Bader on September 3, 2016 at UFC Fight Night 93. He lost the fight via knockout in the second round.

Latifi was expected to face Antônio Rogério Nogueira on June 25, 2017 at UFC Fight Night 112. However, on May 17, it was announced that Nogueira pulled out due to a neck injury. Subsequently, despite having six weeks to secure a replacement opponent, promotion officials elected to remove Latifi from the event entirely.

Latifi faced undefeated prospect Tyson Pedro on September 9, 2017 at UFC 215. He won the fight via unanimous decision, handing Pedro the first loss of his career.

Latifi was expected to face Ovince Saint Preux on January 27, 2018 at UFC on Fox 27. However, he was injured during a training session and was forced to pull from the event, and the bout was cancelled. The pair was rebooked and took place on February 24, 2018 at UFC on Fox 28. Latifi won the fight via submission in the first round. This win earned him the Performance of the Night bonus.

Latifi was expected to face Glover Teixeira on July 22, 2018 at UFC Fight Night 134. However, on July 5, 2018, it was announced that he was pulled from the event, citing injury.

Latifi faced Corey Anderson on December 29, 2018 at UFC 232. He lost the fight via unanimous decision.

Latifi was expected to face Volkan Oezdemir on June 1, 2019 at UFC Fight Night 153. On May 30, 2019 it was reported that Latifi was forced to pull out of the event due to back injury and the bout was cancelled. The pair was rebooked at UFC on ESPN 5 on August 3, 2019. In turn, due to Oezdemir having visa issues to enter United States, the bout was moved to August 10, 2019 at UFC Fight Night 156.  He lost the fight via knockout in the second round.

Move up to heavyweight
On October 14, 2019, news surfaced that Latifi will be moving up to heavyweight division.

Latifi faced Derrick Lewis on February 8, 2020 at UFC 247. He lost the fight via unanimous decision.

Latifi faced Tanner Boser on June 5, 2021 at UFC Fight Night: Rozenstruik vs. Sakai. He won the fight via split decision.

Latifi was next expected to face Alexander Romanov at UFC Fight Night 202 on February 19, 2022. However, the bout was cancelled for undisclosed reasons.

Latifi was scheduled to face Alexey Oleynik on March 26, 2022 at UFC Fight Night 205. However, the day of the event, Latifi withdrew due to illness and the bout was cancelled. The pair was rescheduled to meet on two weeks later at UFC 273 on April 9, 2022. In turn, Latifi withdrew again for unknown reasons and was replaced by Jared Vanderaa. The pair was yet again rescheduled for UFC Fight Night 211 on October 1, 2022. Latifi won the bout via unanimous decision. In the post-fight interview he said that, having reached the age of 40 and the end of his UFC contract, he was unsure of his future in the sport, and that it might have been his last fight. In the same interview he revealed fighting with possible staph infection which he didn't disclose to the athletic commission and was later suspended for three months, making him eligible to return on January 1, 2023.

Latifi is scheduled to face Rodrigo Nascimento on May 20, 2023, at UFC Fight Night 225.

Personal life
Of Albanian origin, Latifi's parents emigrated from Kosovo in the 1960s. Latifi was raised in Rosengård, where he befriended football player Zlatan Ibrahimović. His brother Arben, who Ilir has described as his greatest influence in life, is a black belt in Brazilian jiu-jitsu and was one of the pioneers of Swedish MMA in the early days, winning both the championship in European Open BJJ and the Panamerican Championship during his active career.

In 2016, Latifi was awarded role model of the year and received the most votes for the people's choice award in the annual Swedish martial arts awards ceremony Kampsportsgalan.

Championships and accomplishments

Mixed martial arts
Ultimate Fighting Championship
Performance of the Night (One time)  vs. Ovince Saint Preux 
Tied (Anthony Johnson & Volkan Oezdemir) for most Light Heavyweight stoppage victories in less than one minute in UFC history (2)
Superior Challenge
Superior Challenge Light Heavyweight Championship (One time; First)

Submission wrestling
Abu Dhabi Combat Club
2003 ADCC European Championships 
2004 ADCC European Qualifiers Winner

Amateur wrestling
Nordic Wrestling Association
2001 Nordic Championship Junior -97 kg (213 lbs) Greco-Roman Championship 
Swedish Wrestling Federation
2005 Swedish National Light Heavyweight Greco-Roman Championship

Mixed martial arts record

|-
|Win
|align=center|16–8 (1)
|Aleksei Oleinik
|Decision (unanimous)
|UFC Fight Night: Dern vs. Yan
|
|align=center|3
|align=center|5:00
|Las Vegas, Nevada, United States
|
|-
|Win
|align=center|15–8 (1)
|Tanner Boser
|Decision (split)
|UFC Fight Night: Rozenstruik vs. Sakai 
|
|align=center|3
|align=center|5:00
|Las Vegas, Nevada, United States
|
|-
|Loss
|align=center|14–8 (1)
|Derrick Lewis
|Decision (unanimous)
|UFC 247 
|
|align=center|3
|align=center|5:00
|Houston, Texas, United States
|
|-
|Loss
|align=center|14–7 (1)
|Volkan Oezdemir
|KO (punches) 
|UFC Fight Night: Shevchenko vs. Carmouche 2 
|
|align=center|2
|align=center|4:31
|Montevideo, Uruguay
|
|-
|Loss
|align=center|14–6 (1)
|Corey Anderson
|Decision (unanimous)
|UFC 232 
|
|align=center|3
|align=center|5:00
|Inglewood, California, United States
|
|-
|Win
|align=center| 14–5 (1)
|Ovince Saint Preux
| Technical Submission (guillotine choke)
|UFC on Fox: Emmett vs. Stephens 
|
|align=center|1
|align=center|3:48
|Orlando, Florida, United States
|
|-
|Win
|align=center| 13–5 (1)
|Tyson Pedro
| Decision (unanimous)
|UFC 215 
|
|align=center|3
|align=center|5:00
|Edmonton, Alberta, Canada
|
|-
|Loss
|align=center| 12–5 (1)
|Ryan Bader
| KO (knee)
|UFC Fight Night: Arlovski vs. Barnett
|
|align=center| 2
|align=center| 2:06
|Hamburg, Germany
| 
|-
|Win
|align=center|12–4 (1)
|Gian Villante
|Decision (unanimous)
|UFC 196
|
|align=center|3
|align=center|5:00
|Las Vegas, Nevada, United States
|
|-
|Win
|align=center|11–4 (1)
|Sean O'Connell
|KO (punch)
|UFC Fight Night: Dillashaw vs. Cruz
|
|align=center|1
|align=center|0:30
|Boston, Massachusetts, United States
|
|-
| Win
| align=center| 10–4 (1)
| Hans Stringer
| KO (punches)
| UFC Fight Night: Bisping vs. Leites 
| 
| align=center| 1
| align=center| 0:56
| Glasgow, Scotland
| 
|-
| Loss
| align=center| 9–4 (1)
| Jan Błachowicz
| TKO (body kick and punches)
| UFC Fight Night: Nelson vs. Story
| 
| align=center| 1
| align=center| 1:58
| Stockholm, Sweden
| 
|-
| Win
| align=center| 9–3 (1)
| Chris Dempsey
| KO (punches)
| UFC Fight Night: McGregor vs. Brandao
| 
| align=center| 1
| align=center| 2:07
| Dublin, Ireland
| 
|-
| Win
| align=center| 8–3 (1)
| Cyrille Diabaté
| Submission (guillotine choke)
| UFC Fight Night: Gustafsson vs. Manuwa
| 
| align=center| 1
| align=center| 3:02
| London, England
| 
|-
| Loss
| align=center| 7–3 (1)
| Gegard Mousasi
| Decision (unanimous)
| UFC on Fuel TV: Mousasi vs. Latifi
| 
| align=center| 3
| align=center| 5:00
| Stockholm, Sweden
| 
|-
| Win
| align=center| 7–2 (1)
| Jorge Oliveira
| Decision (unanimous) 
| Superior Challenge 8 
| 
| align=center| 3
| align=center| 5:00
| Malmö, Sweden
| 
|-
| Win
| align=center| 6–2 (1)
| Tony Lopez
| Decision (unanimous) 
| Glory 1: Stockholm 
| 
| align=center| 3
| align=center| 5:00
| Stockholm, Sweden
| 
|-
| Win
| align=center| 5–2 (1)
| Denis Bogdanov
| Submission (americana)
| United Glory 15 
| 
| align=center| 1
| align=center| 0:51
| Moscow, Russia
| 
|-
| Loss
| align=center| 4–2 (1)
| Emanuel Newton
| Decision (unanimous)
| Shark Fights 17: Horwich vs. Rosholt 2
| 
| align=center| 3
| align=center| 5:00
| Frisco, Texas, United States
| 
|-
| Win
| align=center| 4–1 (1)
| Matteo Minonzio
| TKO (head kick)
| Strength and Honor Championship 2
| 
| align=center| 1
| align=center| 4:29
| Geneva, Switzerland
| 
|-
| Loss
| align=center| 3–1 (1)
| Tatsuya Mizuno
| TKO (knee and punches)
| Rumble of the Kings 4
| 
| align=center| 3
| align=center| 0:15
| Norrköping, Sweden
| 
|-
| Win
| align=center| 3–0 (1)
| Darko Krbanjevic
| Submission (armbar)
| Rumble of the Kings 3
| 
| align=center| 1
| align=center| 1:43
| Malmö, Sweden
| 
|-
| Win
| align=center| 2–0 (1)
| Luis Pinho
| TKO (submission to punches)
| Rumble of the Kings 2
| 
| align=center| 1
| align=center| 1:20
| Norrköping, Sweden
| 
|-
| Win
| align=center| 1–0 (1)
| Roman Mihocka
| KO (punches)
| Superior Challenge 2
| 
| align=center| 2
| align=center| 1:55
| Stockholm, Sweden
| 
|-
| NC
| align=center| 0–0 (1)
| Blagoy Ivanov
| NC (ring broke)
| Real Pain Challenge 2
| 
| align=center| 1
| align=center| 0:55
| Sofia, Bulgaria
| 

|-
| Win
|align=center| 1–0
| Christian Colombo
| Submission (north-south choke)
| Adrenaline 3 - Evolution
| 
|align=center| 1
|align=center| 2:33
| Hvidovre, Denmark
| 
|-

See also
 List of current UFC fighters
 List of male mixed martial artists

References

External links
 

Living people
Swedish male mixed martial artists
Light heavyweight mixed martial artists
Heavyweight mixed martial artists
Mixed martial artists utilizing boxing
Mixed martial artists utilizing Greco-Roman wrestling
Swedish male sport wrestlers
Amateur wrestlers
1983 births
Swedish people of Albanian descent
Sportspeople from Malmö
Ultimate Fighting Championship male fighters